13th is a 2016 American documentary film by director Ava DuVernay. The film explores the "intersection of race, justice, and mass incarceration in the United States"; it is titled after the Thirteenth Amendment to the United States Constitution, adopted in 1865, which abolished slavery throughout the United States and ended involuntary servitude except as a punishment for conviction of a crime.

DuVernay contends that slavery has been perpetuated since the end of the American Civil War through criminalizing behavior and enabling police to arrest poor freedmen and force them to work for the state under convict leasing; suppression of African Americans by disenfranchisement, lynchings, and Jim Crow; politicians declaring a war on drugs that weighs more heavily on minority communities and, by the late 20th century, mass incarceration affecting communities of color, especially American descendants of slavery, in the United States. She examines the prison-industrial complex and the emerging detention-industrial complex, discussing how much money is being made by corporations from such incarcerations.

13th garnered acclaim from a number of film critics. It was nominated for the Academy Award for Best Documentary Feature at the 89th Academy Awards,
and won the Primetime Emmy Award for Outstanding Documentary or Nonfiction Special at the 69th Primetime Emmy Awards.

It experienced a surge in viewership by 4,665 percent in June 2020 during the George Floyd protests.

Synopsis
The film begins with an audio clip of President Barack Obama stating that the US had 5 percent of the world's population but 25 percent of the world's prisoners. This film features several activists, academics, political figures from both major US political parties, and public figures, such as Angela Davis, Bryan Stevenson, Michelle Alexander, Jelani Cobb, Van Jones, Newt Gingrich, Cory Booker, Henry Louis Gates Jr., and others.

It explores the economic history of slavery and post-Civil War racist legislation and practices that replaced it. DuVernay contends as "systems of racial control" and forced labor from the years after the abolition of slavery to the present. Southern states criminalized minor offenses, arresting freedmen and forcing them to work when they could not pay fines; institutionalizing this approach as convict leasing (which created an incentive to criminalize more behavior). She contends they disenfranchised most black people across the South at the turn of the 20th century, excluding them from the political system (including juries), at the same time that lynching of black people by white mobs reached a peak. In addition, Jim Crow legislation was passed by Democrats, to legalize segregation and suppress minorities, forcing them into second-class status. Following the passage of civil rights legislation in the 1960s that restored civil rights, the film notes the Republican Party's appeal to southern white conservatives, including the claim to be the party to fight the war on crime and war on drugs, which began to include mandatory, lengthy sentencing. A new wave of minority suppression  began, reaching African Americans and others in the northern, mid-western and western cities where many had migrated in earlier decades. After their presidential candidates lost to Republicans, Democratic politicians such as Bill Clinton joined the war on drugs.

As a result, from the early 1970s to the present, the rate of incarceration and the number of people in prisons has climbed dramatically in the United States, while at the same time the rate of crime in the United States has continued to decline since the late 20th century. As late as the 2016 presidential election, the eventual winner Donald Trump worked to generate fear of crime, claiming high rates in New York City, for instance, which was not true according to the documentary. The documentary states that crime was lower overall than it had been in decades, but that Republican candidates raised it to generate fear. Private prison contractors entered the market to satisfy demand as arrests and sentences increased, forming an independent group with its own economic incentives to criminalize minor activities and lengthen sentences in order to keep prisons full. Politicians and businessmen in rural areas encouraged construction of prisons to supply local jobs, and they also have had incentives to keep prisons full.

The federal Bureau of Prisons announced in 2016 its intention to stop contracting with private providers for prison services. According to the film, the over-incarceration of adults has severely damaged generations of black and minority families and their children.

The film explores the role of the American Legislative Exchange Council, backed by corporations, that has provided Republican state and federal legislators with draft legislation to support the prison-industrial complex. It contends that only after some of the relationships were revealed did corporations like Walmart and others receive criticism and drop out of the organization.

The film explores the demonization of minority poor through these decades to serve political ends, contributing to fears of minorities by whites and to problems of police brutality against minority communities. In the 21st century, the regularity of fatal police shootings of unarmed minorities in apparently minor confrontations has been demonstrated by videos taken by bystanders and by the increasing use of cameras in police cars or worn by officers; DuVernay ends the film with graphic videos of fatal shootings of black people by police, what Manohla Dargis describes as, after the previous discussion, having the effect of "a piercing, keening cry."

Production
The film was written by Ava DuVernay, who wrote and directed Selma (2014), and Spencer Averick. Averick also edited the film. Produced and filmed in secrecy, 13th was revealed only after it was announced as the opening film for the 2016 New York Film Festival, the first documentary ever to open the festival.

Release
The film was released on October 7, 2016, on Netflix. A companion piece 13th: A Conversation with Oprah Winfrey & Ava DuVernay was released on January 26, 2017, in the United States and on January 31, 2017, worldwide on the service. On April 17, 2020, Netflix released the film for free on YouTube.

Reception

Critical response
On Rotten Tomatoes, the film has an approval rating of 97% based on 102 reviews, with an average rating of 8.77/10. The site's critical consensus reads, "13th strikes at the heart of America's tangled racial history, offering observations as incendiary as they are calmly controlled." On Metacritic, the film has a score of 83 out of 100, based on reviews from 29 critics, indicating "universal acclaim".

Manohla Dargis of The New York Times praised what she called the power of DuVernay's film and its meticulous marshaling of facts. She said, summarizing the film, "The United States did not just criminalize a select group of black people. It criminalized black people as a whole, a process that, in addition to destroying untold lives, effectively transferred the guilt for slavery from the people who perpetuated it to the very people who suffered through it." Peter Travers of Rolling Stone awarded the film four stars and named it one of the best films of 2016.

Criticism
Dan Berger of Black Perspectives wrote 13th was at its best in chronicling the lives of individuals in the American prison system, but also said the film "makes several significant factual errors" such as using outdated statistical data and overstating the role of for-profit prisons.
John Anderson of America Magazine also had similar criticism to this film.

Viewership
On a panel about the future of film published in The New York Times, DuVernay said: 

In 2020, the film saw a surge in viewership by 4,665 percent during the George Floyd protests.

Accolades
The film was nominated for dozens of awards, winning best documentary at the British Academy Film Awards and the Primetime Emmy Awards, a Peabody Award for excellence, and receiving a nomination for the Academy Award for Best Documentary Feature. DuVernay received a Primetime Emmy Award for her writing, and was nominated for directing. The song "Letter to the Free" was nominated for several awards with Common, Robert Glasper, and Karriem Riggins winning the Primetime Emmy Award for Outstanding Original Music and Lyrics.

See also 
 
 Slavery in the United States
 Southern strategy
 Jim Crow laws
 The House I Live In (2012 film)

References

External links
 
 
 
 
 

2016 films
2016 documentary films
2010s American films
2010s English-language films
American documentary films
Films directed by Ava DuVernay
Criminal justice reform in the United States
Netflix original documentary films
Documentary films about crime in the United States
Documentary films about law in the United States
Documentary films about race and ethnicity in the United States
Peabody Award-winning broadcasts
Primetime Emmy Award-winning broadcasts